Pulham is a village and civil parish in the county of Dorset in south-west England. In the 2011 Census the civil parish had 105 dwellings, 103 households and a population of 269.

Pulham was mentioned in the Domesday Book of 1086, and was once owned by Cirencester Abbey, a connection remembered in the name of Cannings Court Farm (the "Court of the Canons"). Priests from nearby Milton Abbey also used to visit the village church; they resided above the porch in a priests' room, accessed via a staircase within the wall.

Notable people
George Saxby Penfold was Rector of Pulham from 1797 to 1832, but after 1815 held other livings as well.

See also
HMS Pulham, a Ham class minesweeper

References

External links

Villages in Dorset
Civil parishes in Dorset
North Dorset District